is a Japanese professional basketball player who plays for Nagasaki Velca of the B.League in Japan. Following his college graduation, Sugasawa became a school teacher, but decided to be a professional basketball player. In 2012 he was picked up by the Gunma Crane Thunders with the first overall pick in the bj League draft.  He has been a Happinets hooper since 2013. Former Head Coach Nakamura said that "Sugasawa is the best unsung player." 

Sugasawa used to sell T-shirts at Brex Arena Utsunomiya when he belonged to the TGI D-Rise, a development club for Link Tochigi Brex. He can speak Okinawan language.

Career statistics

Regular season 

|-
| align="left" | 2011-12
| align="left" | TGI
|27||8||15.6 ||50.0%||45.5%||61.0%||3.6 ||0.4||0.3||0||5.7
|-
| align="left" | 2012-13
| align="left" | Gunma
|28||0||6.4 ||26.7%||21.1%||45.5%||0.9 ||0.2||0.3||0.1||2.1
|-
| align="left" | 2013-14
| align="left" | Akita
|46||0||6.7 ||54.3%||-||47.6%||1.2 ||0.2||0.2||0||1.3
|-
| align="left" | 2014-15
| align="left" | Akita
|24||0 ||4.6 ||44.4% ||34.8% ||83.3% ||0.8 ||0.2 ||0.2 ||0.0 ||2.4
|-
| align="left" | 2015-16
| align="left" | Akita
||47 ||0 ||10.6 ||41.3% ||34.2% ||76.6% ||1.1 ||0.6 ||0.4 ||0.1 ||3.5
|-
|style="background-color:#FFCCCC"  align="left" | 2016-17
| align="left" | Akita
||56 ||7 ||11.3 ||24.6% ||20.2% ||73.9% ||1.2 ||0.4 ||0.2 ||0.0 ||1.8
|-
|style="background-color:#FFCCCC"  align="left" | 2017-18
| align="left" | Iwate
||58 ||39 ||20.0 ||35.8% ||22.4% ||61.1% ||3.6 ||1.5 ||0.8 ||0.1 ||5.9
|-
|  align="left" | 2018-19
| align="left" |Sendai
||58 || ||10.8 ||40.7% ||35.7% ||74.3% ||1.4 ||0.9 ||0.2 ||0.0 ||3.6
|-
|  align="left" | 2019-20
| align="left" |Toyama
||32 ||2 ||6.0 ||27.6% ||26.3% ||81.8% ||0.9 ||0.2 ||0.1 ||0.0 ||1.6
|-
|  align="left" | 2020-21
| align="left" |Kyoto
||12 || ||9.7 ||28.6% ||20.0% ||42.9% ||1.0 ||0.8 ||0.0 ||0.1 ||1.5
|-

Playoffs 

|-
| align="left" | 2013-14
| align="left" | Akita
|3|| ||1.33||.500||.000||.250||0 ||0.67||0||0||0.67
|-
|style="text-align:left;"|2016-17
|style="text-align:left;"|Akita
| 3 || 0 || 24.12 || .667 || .000 || .000 || 1.0 || 0.0|| 0 || 0 || 1.3
|-
|style="text-align:left;"|2017-18
|style="text-align:left;"|Iwate
| 1 || 1 || 1.59 || .000 || .000 || .000 || 0.0 || 0.0|| 0 || 0 || 0.0
|-

Early cup games 

|-
|style="text-align:left;"|2017
|style="text-align:left;"|Iwate
| 3 || 3 || 20:03 || .267 || .375 || 1.000 || 2.3 || 3.0 || 0.33 || 0.0 || 4.7
|-
|style="text-align:left;"|2018
|style="text-align:left;"|Sendai
|2 || 0 || 7:53 || .000 || .000 || .500 || 1.5 || 0.5 || 0.0 || 0 || 0.5
|-
|style="text-align:left;"|2019
|style="text-align:left;"|Toyama
|2 || 0 || 4:31 || .500 || .500 || .000 || 1.0 || 0.5 || 0.0 || 0 || 1.5
|-

References

1987 births
Living people
Akita Northern Happinets players
Gunma Crane Thunders players
Iwate Big Bulls players
Japanese men's basketball players
Kyoto Hannaryz players
Sendai 89ers players
Sportspeople from Ibaraki Prefecture
Sportspeople from Okinawa Prefecture
TGI D-Rise players
Toyama Grouses players
Forwards (basketball)